The 2010 Mr. Olympia was an IFBB professional bodybuilding competition and the feature event of Joe Weider's Olympia Fitness & Performance Weekend 2010 which was held September 23–26, 2010 at the Las Vegas Convention Center and the Orleans Arena in Las Vegas, Nevada.  It was the 46th Mr. Olympia competition.  Other events at the exhibition included the 202 Olympia Showdown, 
Ms. Olympia, Fitness Olympia, and Figure Olympia contests.

Results

Notable events
Jay Cutler celebrated his fourth title, and second consecutive victory
Dexter Jackson, the 2008 champion, placed 4th
Phil Heath placed runner-up in his third Mr. Olympia contest, he placed 3rd in 2008 and 5th in 2009

See also
 2010 Ms. Olympia

References

External links 
 Mr. Olympia

 2010
Mr. Olympia
Mr. Olympia 2010
2010 in bodybuilding
Mr. Olympia 2010